Casanova Lonati is a comune (municipality) in the Province of Pavia in the Italian region Lombardy, located about 40 km south of Milan and about 11 km southeast of Pavia. As of 31 December 2004, it had a population of 455 and an area of 4.6 km².

Casanova Lonati borders the following municipalities: Albaredo Arnaboldi, Barbianello, Mezzanino, Pinarolo Po, Verrua Po.

Demographic evolution

References

Cities and towns in Lombardy